The 1984 United States presidential election in Delaware took place on November 6, 1984. All 50 states and the District of Columbia, were part of the 1984 United States presidential election. State voters chose three electors to the Electoral College, which selected the president and vice president of the United States. Delaware was won by incumbent United States president Ronald Reagan of California, who was running against former vice president Walter Mondale of Minnesota. Reagan ran for a second time with former C.I.A. Director George H. W. Bush of Texas, and Mondale ran with Representative Geraldine Ferraro of New York, the first major female candidate for the vice presidency.

The presidential election of 1984 was a very partisan election for Delaware, with over 99% of the electorate voting either Democratic or Republican, though 6 parties appeared on the ballot. All three of Delaware's counties gave Reagan an outright majority.

Delaware weighed in for this election as 1% more Republican than the national average. Reagan won Delaware by just shy of 20%, which made Delaware about 1% more Republican than the nation at large. His strongest county was Sussex County, Delaware's southernmost county, where he received over 2/3 of the vote. He also received over 60% in Delaware's middle county, Kent County. In New Castle County, Delaware's northernmost and most populous county, Reagan won by double digits, but was held to a 14.5% margin, discernibly less than his national margin. 

In the Gilded Age, Delaware generally voted as part of the Democratic Solid South, voting Democratic in every election from 1868 through 1892 save 1872. From the 1896 election on, Delaware became a conservative-leaning state for about half a century, being one of only two Southern states to vote for Hughes in 1916 and one of only six states nationally to vote for Hoover in 1932. From 1952, however, Delaware became a bellwether state. 1984 was the tenth election in a row in which Delaware voted for the national winner.

However, 1984 would (as of 2020) turn out to be the second-to-last time that a Republican would carry the Blue Hen State. Although Reagan comfortably carried New Castle County, Republicans would not carry--or even exceed 40% in--Delaware's northernmost and by far most populous county from 1992 on. Democratic strength in this largely urbanized county has been more than enough to carry the state for the Democrats, even though Republicans remain dominant in Sussex County and competitive in Kent County.

Results

Results by county

See also
 United States presidential elections in Delaware
 Presidency of Ronald Reagan

References

Delaware
1984
1984 Delaware elections